Boban Stojanović may refer to:
 Boban Stojanović (footballer)
 Boban Stojanović (activist)